Chernaya Balka is a Russian botanical park. It is one of the Protected areas of Russia. It is a zakaznik and was created on September 22, 1977. The main population centers are Bogatov, Belaya Kalitva, village Kakichev. The monument has value for soil-protection, water security and erosion control. It plays environmental, scientific, recreational and educational roles.

Geography 
It is located on the right bank of the river Seversky Donets, southwest Bogatov, Rostov Oblast. It occupies 212,67 hectares.

The terrains is fforest steppe. The soil type is south chernozem.

The most typical relief is a ridge-hollow. The site is a highly ramified beam web, located in a Chernaya Balka that flows directly into the valley of Seversky Donets.

Flora and fauna 
Twenty species of trees and over one hundred species of herbaceous plants occupy the park.

The floodplain forest is made up of debris and oak forests. Their distinctive feature is the spread of the acer tataricum and inclusion in the acer campestre. Forest grasses in the floodplain include Brachypodium sylvaticum, Viola hirta, Campanula carpatica, Scutellaria altissima and Delphinium elatum. More than 150 species of vascular plants are registered. 11 are listed in the Red Book of the Rostov Oblast. Among them there are Stipa pulcherrima, Stipa ucranica, Delphīnium schmalhausēnii , Bellevalia sarmatica and Iris humilis.

Wildlife is diverse and abundant. Wild boars, capreolus, European hares, foxes, pheasants, quail, grey partridges, common wood pigeon, moose and red deer. Species listed in the Red Data Book of the Russian Federation include white-tailed eagle and saga pedo. The area includes diverse habitats, including forest, floodplain and steppe complexes.

References 

Tourist attractions in Rostov Oblast
Protected areas of Russia